Telomere length regulation protein TEL2 homolog is a protein that in humans is encoded by the TELO2 gene.

Function
In 2007, researchers reported an unexpected role for Tel2 in the expression of all mammalian phosphatidylinositol 3-kinase-related protein kinases (PIKKs). Although Tel2 was identified as a budding yeast gene required for the telomere length maintenance, they found no obvious telomeric function for mammalian Tel2. Tel2 deletion also curbed mTOR signaling, indicating that Tel2 affects mammalian PIKKs.  Tel2 binds to part of the HEAT repeat segments of ATM and mTOR, and is a highly conserved regulator of PIKK stability.

References

Further reading

External links 
 

Telomere-related proteins